The Nokia 7510 Supernova is a phone made by Nokia. It contains a 2-megapixel camera and a 2.2" QVGA colour display with a 320x
240 resolution.

It was initially available in the United States, but it spread into other markets; firmware was available for nearly all markets.

References

External links 
 Nokia support page
 phone review
 http://nds1.nokia.com/files/support/nam/phones/guides/Nokia_7510_Supernova_UG_en-US_es-LAM.pdf, the user manual for same. 

7510 supernova
Mobile phones introduced in 2008